Southern LNG is a re-gasification facility on Elba Island, in Chatham County, Georgia, five miles (8 km) downstream from Savannah, Georgia. The initial authorization for the Elba Island facility was issued in 1972. LNG shipments ceased during the first half of 1980. On March 16, 2000, the project received Federal Energy Regulatory Commission (FERC) authorization to re-commission and renovate the LNG facilities.

On April 10, 2003, FERC issued an order authorizing the expansion of the facility, which included adding a second and third docking berth, a fourth cryogenic storage tank, and associated facilities. The expansion enabled an increase of working gas capacity and an increase of the firm sendout rate.

El Paso Corporation, the owner of the Southern LNG facility, announced the start up of the expanded facility, called Elba II, on February 1, 2006.

El Paso Corporation also applied for an additional expansion, on February 1, 2006, called Elba III, to double capacity again by 2010. On September 20, 2007 FERC approved El Paso's expansion for Elba III.

Stats
Operator: Southern LNG, Inc. (inbound-ship terminus) - Elba Express Company, LLC (outbound-pipeline terminus)
Owner: Kinder Morgan (100%)
Capacity:  
Total peak send-out capacity: over

Latha Anderson, et al. v. FERC
On March 24, 2008 Latha Anderson ("Anderson") filed a suit against FERC, Latha Anderson, et al. v. FERC, asking that FERC deny construction authority for the Northern Segment of Elba Express’ proposed pipeline (part of the Elba III project). Anderson charged that a thorough review for alternative route site selection was not done and that the Environmental Impact Statement (EIS) was manipulated to make the final approved, Northern Segment, route appeared to have the least impact on the environment. Anderson proposed that FERC reconsider a new route. Previously, on July 12, 2007 Anderson had ask FERC to deny the pipeline going through the Northern Segment. FERC denied Anderson’s motion for hearing, but said that it will review the petition.

References

Liquefied natural gas terminals
Natural gas infrastructure in the United States